Foxfield is a village on the west coast of Cumbria, England, in the Furness district that was part of Lancashire from 1182 to 1974. It lies on the Duddon Estuary, just outside the Lake District National Park, around ten miles to the north-east of Barrow-in-Furness and one mile out of Broughton-in-Furness.  It is part of the parish of Broughton West.

The village contains a public house, the Prince of Wales, and Foxfield railway station on the Cumbria Coast Line, where a branch line to Broughton and Coniston used to commence.

References

External links

Villages in Cumbria
Furness
Populated coastal places in Cumbria
South Lakeland District